Andrei Hodorogea (1878, Slobozia-Hodorogea - 20 August 1917, Chişinău) was a politician from Bessarabia.

Biography
Andrei Hodorogea was born in 1878 in Slobozia-Hodorogea. He studied in Cucuruzeni and then in Russia and became an engineer. He advocated the national cause and in 1917 became an activist of the National Moldavian Party 
 
In the evening of 20 August 1917 some 200 Russian soldiers, with Bolshevist leaders, seized and murdered two of the most conspicuous Moldavian leaders, Andrei Hodorogea and Simeon G. Murafa, in Chişinău itself.

Honours
 Andrei Hodorogea Street (former Raleev Street), in Sectorul Botanica, Chişinău
 Monument to Simion Murafa, Alexei Mateevici and Andrei Hodorogea, opened in 1933

References

Bibliography 
 Eremia, Anatol (2001). Unitatea patrimoniului onomastic românesc. Toponimie. Antroponimie (ed. ediție jubiliară). Chișinău: Centrul Național de Terminologie, ed. „Iulian”. p. 62. .

External links 
  Declaraţie privind restabilirea monumentului înălţat în grădina Catedralei în memoria eroilor naţionali: Simion Murafa, Alexei Mateevici şi Andrei Hodorogea

Romanian people of Moldovan descent
1878 births
1917 deaths
People from Orhei District
Moldovan journalists
Male journalists
Moldovan writers
Moldovan male writers
Moldovan engineers
People murdered in Russia
People from the Russian Empire